Biryukovka is a rural locality (a selo) and the administrative center of Biryukovsky Selsoviet, Privolzhsky District, Astrakhan Oblast, Russia. The population was 1,857 as of 2010. There are 16 streets.

Geography 
Biryukovka is located 12 km southeast of Nachalovo (the district's administrative centre) by road. Kulpa is the nearest rural locality.

References 

Rural localities in Privolzhsky District, Astrakhan Oblast